TBS GB (Telematic and Biomedical Services Great Britain) is the UK arm of the ITAL TBS group of companies. ITAL TBS is a provider of healthcare and clinical engineering in Europe, with total revenue of US$200 million in 2006. The company is privately owned; shareholders include GE, the Generali group and the company managers.

History 
ITAL TBS was established in the 1980s as an advanced research provider in a research environment. In 2004 the company acquired the clinical engineering arm of GE Healthcare in Europe.

 
Health care companies of the United Kingdom